Bolshoye Kostino is a rural locality (a village) in Komyanskoye Rural Settlement, Gryazovetsky District, Vologda Oblast, Russia. The population was 6 as of 2002.

Geography 
Bolshoye Kostino is located 24 km north of Gryazovets (the district's administrative centre) by road. Maloye Kostino is the nearest rural locality.

References 

Rural localities in Gryazovetsky District